Mark Allen Reeds (January 24, 1960 – April 14, 2015) was a Canadian professional ice hockey coach and a former player who had played in the National Hockey League (NHL) between 1981 and 1989. He was born in Toronto, Ontario, but grew up in Burlington, Ontario.

Reeds died of esophageal cancer while serving as an assistant coach for the Ottawa Senators of the NHL on April 14, 2015.

Playing career
Reeds began his junior career with the Toronto Marlboros of the Ontario Major Junior Hockey League (OMJHL), playing 18 games with them in 1976–77. He then moved to the Peterborough Petes for the remainder of his junior career, playing with the club from 1977 to 1980. He was drafted by the St. Louis Blues in the fifth round of the 1979 NHL Entry Draft.

Reeds spent the entire 1980–81 season with the Salt Lake Golden Eagles of the Central Hockey League (CHL), and a majority of the 1981–82 with them. Reeds got a taste of NHL action with the Blues, appearing in nine regular season games with St. Louis, then playing in ten more in the NHL playoffs. He again split the 1982–83 season between the Golden Eagles and Blues before staying in St. Louis exclusively in 1983–84. On October 5, 1987, the Blues traded Reeds to the Hartford Whalers. He only appeared in 38 games with the Whalers due to injuries in 1987–88, and split the 1988–89 season between Hartford and the Binghamton Whalers of the American Hockey League (AHL). Reeds played in Italy from 1989 to 1991 before returning to North America, and in 1992–93, Reeds saw his last action as a player, suiting up for 16 games with the Peoria Rivermen of the International Hockey League (IHL). Overall, he appeared in 365 NHL games, scoring 45 goals and 114 assists for a total of 159 points.  He also appeared in 53 NHL playoff games, earning 17 points.

Coaching career

Minor leagues
Following his playing career, he became a coach, serving as an assistant coach with the IHL's Peoria Rivermen from 1992 to 1996.  The Rivermen moved to the ECHL for the 1996–97 season, and Reeds was elevated to head coach, leading the club to a 43–21–6 record. He spent the next two seasons in Peoria before moving to the United Hockey League's Missouri River Otters, leading the expansion club to the playoffs in its first season, 1999–2000. He led the Otters to the playoffs in each of his four seasons, then moved to the Kalamazoo Wings of the UHL, leading the squad to the 2006 Colonial Cup Championship, 4 games to 1 over Danbury in the finals. The Wings returned to the league's final series in 2007, but fell to the Rockford IceHogs in seven games. Reeds was hired as the head coach of the Owen Sound Attack of the Ontario Hockey League in July 2007.

Owen Sound Attack
In his first season with the Attack in 2007–08, the rebuilding club struggled, failing to make the playoffs. Owen Sound improved in 2008–09, as they earned 20 more points than the previous season, and made the playoffs, where they went out in the first round.  The Attack then struggled in 2009–10, missing the playoffs for the second time in three seasons. In 2010–11, Owen Sound, predicted to be a border-line playoff team, wound up having the best record in the Western Conference. In the playoffs, the Attack easily defeated the London Knights, Plymouth Whalers and Windsor Spitfires to make the J. Ross Robertson Cup finals. In the finals, the Attack upset the heavily-favoured Mississauga St. Michael's Majors in seven games to represent the OHL in the 2011 Memorial Cup. After shutting out the Kootenay Ice 5–0 in their first game, injuries caught up with the Attack, as they lost their next two round-robin games, followed by a 7–3 loss to Kootenay in a tie-breaker, to be eliminated from the tournament.

Ottawa Senators
On June 23, 2011, newly-hired Ottawa Senators head coach Paul MacLean named Reeds as one of his assistant coaches.

Illness and death
In March 2015, the Senators announced that Reeds had been diagnosed with an inoperable form of cancer. Reeds died on April 14, 2015 at the age of 55 from esophageal cancer; having been hospitalized with pneumonia, and is survived by wife Mary and two children.

During the 2015 Stanley Cup Playoffs, both the Montreal Canadiens and Senators held moments of silence in Reeds' memory.

Career statistics

Regular season and playoffs

International

Coaching record

External links

References

1960 births
2015 deaths
Binghamton Whalers players
Canadian ice hockey coaches
Canadian ice hockey forwards
Deaths from cancer in Missouri
Deaths from esophageal cancer
Hartford Whalers players
HC Fiemme Cavalese players
Ottawa Senators coaches
Owen Sound Attack coaches
Peoria Rivermen (IHL) players
Salt Lake Golden Eagles (CHL) players
St. Louis Blues draft picks
St. Louis Blues players
Sportspeople from Burlington, Ontario
Ice hockey people from Toronto